The Battle of Meissen (4 December 1759) was an Austrian victory over a smaller Prussian force during the Third Silesian War (part of the Seven Years' War). An Austrian force under the command of general Beck assaulted 3,500 Prussian troops under Diericke at Meissen, overwhelming them and driving the survivors across the Elbe. The Prussians lost 400 men in the action and 1,543 fell prisoner. Austrian losses were few, totalling only 72 killed and 115 wounded. The Austrians secured an important victory, which effectively kept their ally Saxony in the war.

Footnotes

References
 Szabo, Franz. The Seven Years War in Europe: 1756–1763. Routledge, 2013,  .

Battle of Meissen
Battles of the Seven Years' War
Battles involving Austria
Battles involving Prussia
1759 in the Holy Roman Empire
18th century in Saxony
Battles in Saxony
Battles of the Silesian Wars